Formula 5000 or F5000 is a historic single seater, open wheeler series that is currently run in New Zealand.

Regulations 
The cars are made to be kept as period correct as possible and thus are split into two classes Group A which are cars built before 1971 and Group B cars built in and after 1971. They run period correct brakes and wheels, bodywork, shock absorbers, and try to keep historical accuracy with liveries and paintwork. The Group A cars have a minimum weight of 567 kg and the Group B cars have to run with a minimum weight of 612 kg. They run with 5.0L big block engines mainly built by Chevrolet or Ford.

Cars 
There are currently seven different manufactures being represented; Lola, Begg, March, Talon, McLaren, McRae and Elfin.

Lola 

Currently the Lola T430, T142, T190, T330, T400 and T332 are used.

Begg 

The Begg FM2, FM4, FM5 and 018 are currently driven.

March 

Only the 73A/2 is driven.

Talon 

Only the MR1 is in the series.

McLaren 

The M22 and M23 are used.

McRae 

The GM1 is driven.

Elfin 

The MR8A is the only Elfin in the field.

Taupo Historic Grand Prix 
In 2016 there was a plan to hold a Race of Champions meeting between the Formula 5000 cars and Historic F1 cars at Bruce McLaren Motorsport Park. This went ahead on the 28th and 29 January 2017. The race was won by Historic F1 driver Micheal Lyons 3.8s ahead of Ken Smith who was the top F5000 driver.

References 

Motorsport
Motorsport in New Zealand
Motorsport competitions in New Zealand